Kabuli Kid is a 2008 French-Afghan drama film directed by Barmak Akram. It stars Haji Gul Aser, Leena Alam, Valéry Schatz and Amélie Glenn. The film, about a Kabul-based taxi driver who finds an infant left in his back seat, was screened at the 65th Venice International Film Festival at the 23rd International Film Critics' Week and won EIUC Human Rights Film Award. It was produced by Fidélité Films, 4 à 4 Productions, and Les Auteurs Associés.

Cast
Haji Gul Aser as Khaled
Valéry Schatz as Mathieu
Amélie Glenn as Marie
Mohammad Chafi Sahel as Baba
Leena Alam as Khaled's wife
Messi Gul as the abandoned infant
Saleha Khan Gul 
Rohina Gul
Mariam Hakimi

Reception
The film was critically acclaimed. Variety wrote: "Observation and narrative are so skillfully intertwined that every detail gestates a potential full-blown story and every story point teems with cultural contradictions. Thus, when Khaled’s wife Leena Alam slips among the veiled women waiting to claim the infant, she silently unleashes a subversively alternate point of view. Highly accomplished tech credits reinforce pic's authenticity."

References

External links

French drama films
2008 drama films
French independent films
2008 independent films
Films set in Afghanistan
Afghan drama films
2000s French films